, also known as  or Inadahime among other names, is a goddess (kami) in Japanese mythology. She is one of the wives of the god Susanoo, who rescued her from the monster Yamata no Orochi.

Name
The goddess is named 'Kushinadahime' (櫛名田比売) in the Kojiki, while the Nihon Shoki variously names her 'Kushiinadahime' (奇稲田姫), 'Inadahime' (稲田姫), and 'Makamifuru-Kushiinadahime' (真髪触奇稲田媛).

'Inadahime' may be translated either as "lady / princess (hime) of Inada", with "Inada" (稲田) here being understood as the name of a place in Izumo Province (part of what is now the town of Okuizumo (formerly Yokota) in Nita District, Shimane Prefecture), or "lady / princess of the rice fields" (inada literally translated means "rice field" or "rice paddy"). The element kushi (Old Japanese: kusi) meanwhile is usually interpreted as the adjective meaning "wondrous"; it is homophonous with the word for "comb" (櫛), which features in her story in both the Kojiki and the Shoki. The epithet makamifuru (lit. "true-hair-touching"), found in a variant account cited in the Shoki, is understood as a stock epithet or makurakotoba associated with the word "comb".

The Fudoki of Izumo Province meanwhile gives the name of the goddess as 久志伊奈太美等与麻奴良比売命, commonly read as 'Kushiinada-Mitoyomanurahime-no-Mikoto'. One theory interprets the name to mean roughly "princess of the wondrous rice fields (kushi-inada) soaking wet (manura) [and] overflowing with water (mitoyo, here understood as an epithet meaning "water-abundant")".

Mythology

The slaying of the Yamata no Orochi 

In the Kojiki and the Nihon Shoki, the god Susanoo, after his banishment from the heavenly realm Takamagahara, came down to earth, to the land of Izumo, where he encountered an elderly couple named Tenazuchi and Ashinazuchi, both children of the mountain god Ōyamatsumi. They told him of a monstrous creature from the nearby land of Koshi known as the Yamata no Orochi ("eight-forked serpent") that had devoured seven of their eight daughters. Upon hearing this, Susanoo agreed to kill the serpent on condition that they give him their sole surviving daughter, Kushinadahime, to be his wife.

The version recounted in the Nihon Shoki's main narrative is as follows (translation by William George Aston):

After defeating the serpent, Susanoo built a palace or shrine for Kushinadahime in a place called Suga - so named because Susanoo felt refreshed (sugasugashi) upon arriving there - and made her father Ashinazuchi its head (obito), giving him the title 'Inada-no-Miyanushi-Suga-no-Yatsumimi-no-Kami' (稲田宮主須賀之八耳神 "Master of the Palace of Inada, the Eight-Eared Deity of Suga"). On that occasion, he composed a song in tanka form later held to be the root of Japanese waka poetry:

{|
! Man'yōgana (Kojiki)|| || Japanese|| || Old Japanese || || Modern Japanese (Rōmaji) || || Translated by Edwin Cranston
|-
| 夜久毛多都伊豆毛夜幣賀岐都麻碁微爾夜幣賀岐都久流曾能夜幣賀岐袁
|  
| 
|  
| Yakumo1 tatuIdumo1 yape1gaki1tumago2mi2 niyape1gaki1 tukuruso2no2 yape1gaki1 wo
|  
| Yakumo tatsuIzumo yaegakitsumagomi niyaegaki tsukurusono yaegaki o 
|  
| In eight-cloud-risingIzumo an eightfold fenceTo enclose my wifeAn eightfold fence I build,And, oh, that eightfold fence!
|}

The child born to Susanoo and Kushinadahime is variously identified as Yashimajinumi in the Kojiki and Ōnamuchi (Ōkuninushi) in the Shoki'''s main account.

Variants

While most accounts identify the headwaters of the river Hi in Izumo (肥河 / 簸之川, Hi-no-Kawa, identified with the Hii River in modern Shimane Prefecture) as the place where Susanoo descended, one variant in the Shoki instead has Susanoo arriving at the upper reaches of the river E (可愛之川 E-no-Kawa) in the province of Aki (identified with the Gōnokawa River in modern Hiroshima Prefecture). In this version, Inadahime - whose name is given here as 'Makamifuru-Kushiinadahime' (真髪触奇稲田媛) - is not yet born when Susanoo slew the Yamata no Orochi.

A legend associated with Yaegaki Shrine in Matsue, Shimane Prefecture claims that Susanoo hid Kushinadahime in an "eightfold fence" (yaegaki) in the forest within the shrine's precincts during his battle with the Yamata no Orochi.

In the Izumo Fudoki

A legend recorded in the Izumo Fudoki concerning the township of Kumatani (熊谷郷) in Iishi District (part of the modern city of Unnan in Shimane) relates that Kushinadahime - as 'Kushiinada-Mitoyomanurahime' - passed through the area while she was about to give birth. The township's name is said to come from her exclamation: "How deep and well hidden (kumakumashiki) this valley (tani) is!"

In the Hōki Fudoki
An excerpt claimed to be from the now-lost Fudoki of Hōki Province (modern western Tottori Prefecture) relates that Inadahime fled to Hōki and hid in the mountains when the Yamata no Orochi was about to devour her. The province's name (originally Hahaki) is here said to be derived from her cry for help: "Mother, come!" (haha kimase)

 Worship 

As with other Shinto kami, Kushinadahime is venerated at many shrines across Japan, usually together with her husband Susanoo but also sometimes by herself or with other (related or unrelated) deities. Some examples of Shinto shrines which enshrine her are as follows.

 Inada Shrine in Okuizumo, Shimane Prefecture
This shrine enshrines Kushinadahime as its main deity, with Susanoo and Ōyamatsumi serving as auxiliary deities. Near the shrine is the Ubuyu-no-Ike (産湯の池, lit. "Birth-Bath Pond"), a pond claimed to be the place where Kushinadahime received her first bath (ubuyu) after being born, and a sasa bamboo grove that is said to have grown out of the bamboo spatula (hera) that was used to cut the newborn Kushinadahime's umbilical cord known as the Sasa-no-Miya (笹の宮).
Yaegaki Shrine, in Matsue, Shimane Prefecture
Kushinadahime is one of this shrine's deities alongside Susanoo, Ōnamuchi (Ōkuninushi) and Aohata-Sakusahiko (one of Susanoo's children recorded in the Izumo Fudoki). As mentioned above, shrine legend claims that Susanoo hid Kushinadahime in the wooded area within the shrine's precincts known as Sakusame Forest (佐久佐女の森 Sakusame no mori) during his battle with the Yamata no Orochi.
 Susa Shrine in Izumo, Shimane Prefecture
This shrine's deities are Susanoo, Kushinadahime, Tenazuchi and Ashinazuchi. Located in the former township of Susa (須佐郷), a place closely associated with Susanoo; indeed, a legend recorded in the Izumo Fudoki states that Susanoo himself enshrined his spirit here. The shrine's priestly lineage, the Susa (or Inada) clan (須佐氏 / 稲田氏), were considered to be Susanoo's descendants via his son Yashimashino-no-Mikoto (八島篠命, the Kojiki's Yashimajinumi) or Ōkuninushi.
 Suga Shrine in Unnan, Shimane Prefecture
This shrine is claimed to stand on the site of the palace Susanoo built after defeating the Yamata no Orochi and enshrines Susanoo, Kushinadahime, and their son Suga-no-Yuyamanushi-Minasarohiko-Yashima-no-Mikoto (清之湯山主三名狭漏彦八島野命, i.e. Yashimajinumi).
 Kushida Shrine (櫛田宮 Kushida-gū) in Kanzaki, Saga Prefecture
Dedicated to Susanoo, Kushinadahime, and Yamato Takeru. Legend claims that the shrine was founded by Yamato Takeru's father Emperor Keikō, who visited the area and enshrined these three deities. A camphor tree in the shrine grounds is said to have grown out of a koto that the emperor buried in the ground.
 Kushida Shrine (櫛田神社 Kushida-jinja) in Imizu, Toyama Prefecture
This shrine, claimed to have been founded by Takenouchi no Sukune, enshrines Susanoo and Kushinadahime as its principal deities.
 Yasaka Shrine in Gion, Higashiyama, Kyoto, Kyoto Prefecture
 Hiromine Shrine in Himeji, Hyōgo Prefecture
Hikawa Shrine in Ōmiya, Saitama, Saitama Prefecture
The ichinomiya of former Musashi Province, dedicated to Susanoo, Kushinadahime, and Ōnamuchi. Many of its branch shrines - concentrated in Saitama Prefecture and Tokyo - such as Akasaka Hikawa Shrine (Akasaka, Minato City, Tokyo) or Kawagoe Hikawa Shrine (Kawagoe, Saitama) also venerate these three deities, though some either enshrine Susanoo alone or pair him with other gods (e.g. Azabu Hikawa Shrine in Moto-Azabu, Minato, Tokyo, dedicated to Susanoo and Yamato Takeru).
Inada Shrine in Kasama, Ibaraki Prefecture
This shrine to Kushinadahime is classified in the Jinmyōchō (神名帳, lit. 'Register of Shrine Names') section of the Engishiki as a 'notable shrine' or myōjin-taisha, attesting to its status since antiquity. The shrine's original site is located some 300 meters northwest of the current location, situated beside a spring-fed pond known as Yoshii (好井). According to legend, Kushinadahime appeared to a child who was drawing water from the spring and asked that shrines dedicated to her, her husband Susanoo, and her parents Tenazuchi and Ashinazuchi be built there.

Kushinadahime and Harisaijo

During the medieval and early modern periods, Susanoo was popularly conflated with the pestilence deity Gozu Tennō, the god originally worshiped in Yasaka Shrine in Kyoto, Hiromine Shrine in Hyōgo Prefecture, and Tsushima Shrine in Tsushima, Aichi Prefecture. As Susanoo's consort, Kushinadahime was in turn identified with Gozu Tennō's wife, Harisaijo (頗梨采女 or 波利采女, also known as 'Harisainyo', 'Barisainyo', or 'Harisai Tennyo' (頗梨采天女)), the third daughter of the dragon (nāga) king Sāgara. Indeed, while Yasaka Shrine in Kyoto currently enshrines Susanoo, his wives (Kushinadahime, Kamu-Ōichihime, and Samirahime), and his eight children (Yashimajinumi, I(so)takeru, Ōya(tsu)hime, Tsumatsuhime, Ōtoshi, Ukanomitama, Ōyabiko, and Suseribime), its original deities were Gozu Tennō, Harisaijo, and their eight sons, collectively known as the 'Eight Princes' (八王子, Hachiōji).

 Legacy 
The asteroid 10613 Kushinadahime, discovered in 1997, is named after Kushinadahime.

Kushinadahime was portrayed by Misa Uehara in the 1959 film The Birth of Japan''.

Notes

References

See also
Susanoo
Somin Shōrai

Shinto kami
Harvest goddesses
Agricultural goddesses
Food goddesses
Food deities
Love and lust goddesses
Marriage goddesses
Childhood goddesses
Japanese goddesses
Gion faith
Kunitsukami